William Brocklehurst Stonehouse,   D.C.L. (b Manchester 14 April 1793 – d Owston 18 December 1862) was Archdeacon of Stow from 1862 until his death.

Stonehouse matriculated at Corpus Christi College, Oxford in 1812, graduating B.A. in 1816.  He held for many years the living at Owston.

Notes

1793 births
19th-century English Anglican priests
Alumni of Brasenose College, Oxford
Archdeacons of Stow
1862 deaths
Clergy from Manchester